Arkady Nikolayevich Simanov (born 7 March 1992) is a Russian professional association football player. He plays for FC Zenit-Izhevsk.

Club career
He made his Russian Football National League debut for FC Olimpiyets Nizhny Novgorod on 11 April 2018 in a game against FC Yenisey Krasnoyarsk.

External links

1992 births
Sportspeople from Izhevsk
Living people
Russian footballers
Association football midfielders
FC Nizhny Novgorod (2015) players
FC Zenit-Izhevsk players
FC Luch Vladivostok players
FC Tyumen players
Russian First League players
Russian Second League players